Salvador Gabriel del Río de Angelis (born 2 October 1976) is a Spanish chess grandmaster. He won the Spanish Chess Championship in 2018.

Chess career
Del Río was born in 1976 in Argentina. He earned his international master title in 1997 and his grandmaster title in 2002. He is the No. 19 ranked Spanish player as of July 2021. He won the Spanish Chess Championship in 2018.

References

External links

1976 births
Living people
Chess grandmasters
Argentine chess players
Spanish chess players